Benjamin G. Vergnion (born 1973 in Cologny, Switzerland) is a Swiss entrepreneur and creative director. 
He grew up influenced by the Helvetic design, structure and a lot of international exposure living in Geneva, London, Hong Kong and Monaco. He moved to New york in 1992 and attended the New York University Stern School of Business from which he received a degree in Finance and Marketing. 
After a 5-year private banking experience at Chase and DLJ, and several positions as Art and Creative Director in prominent design firms, Benjamin Vergnion assumed the role of Chief Executive and Creative Director of his own agency, Buro Creative, working alongside brands like BMW, Mini, Columbia Records, Sony Music, MSC Cruises, Ford Luxury Automotive, Aston Martin, Jaeger Le Coultre, Audemars Piguet, Rockstar and Warner Music Group. 
In 2009, after selling his agency portfolio he made his way into the fashion arena by financing the launch and marketing strategy of several brands including Spring Court 1936 and Happy Socks in North America. From 2010-2012 he was also a contributor to online fashion journal Selectism and Highsnobiety. 
In 2012 he launched his own venture, Etiquette Clothiers, a Men's luxury basics brand. Since the launch, Etiquette became a provider essentials, including socks, underwear, swimwear and shirts that can be found at some of the retailers around the world including By George, Barneys NY, Steven Alan, Brooklyn Circus, Fred Segal, Mohawk General Store, Ron Herman, Michel Brisson, Harry Rosen, Colette, Le Bon Marche, Liberty, Selfridges, United Arrows and Tomorrowland. Benjamin Vergnion also managed to collaborate with some fashion designers or labels including the likes of Steven Alan, Colette, Mark McNairy, Globe-Trotter, Le Berlinois, Robert Geller, Brooklyn Circus and Freemans Sporting Club.

References

New York University Stern School of Business alumni
1973 births
Living people
People from the canton of Geneva
New York University alumni